Timbrell is a surname. Notable people with the surname include:

Benjamin Timbrell (c. 1683–1754), English master builder and architect
Dennis Timbrell (born 1946), Canadian politician
Robert Timbrell (1920–2006), Canadian admiral
Tiny Timbrell (1917–1992), Canadian-born session musician and master guitarist